Myaw Lint Chin Myar Swar is a 2006 Burmese drama film, directed by Maung Myo Min starring Htun Htun Win, Zin Wine, Yan Aung, Ye Aung, Dwe, Min Maw Kun, Nine Nine, Phoe Kyaw, Min Kha, Pyay Ti Oo, Hat Kat, May Thinzar Oo, Soe Moe Kyi, Pan Phyu, Soe Myat Nandar, Nawarat and Paing Phyo Thu. It is an awareness film about the disease HIV/AIDS.

Cast
Htun Htun Win as Father of Pwint Khet Wai
Zin Wine as U Tin Swe Nyein
Yan Aung as Dr. U Myint Mo
Ye Aung as U Aung Naing
Dwe as the painter
Min Maw Kun as Khit Min Nyo
Nine Nine as Sit Naing
Phoe Kyaw as Ye Myint Mo
Min Kha as Htoo Aung
Pyay Ti Oo as Pyay Ti Oo
Hat Kat as Dr. Kaung Zaw
May Thinzar Oo as Daw Yin Nyo
Soe Moe Kyi as Mother of Sit Naing
Pan Phyu as Pwint Khet Wai
Soe Myat Nandar as Phyu Myint Mo
Nawarat as partner of the painter
Paing Phyo Thu as Phoo Ngone

Awards

References

2006 films
2000s Burmese-language films
Burmese drama films
Films shot in Myanmar
2006 drama films